John Blyth or John Blythe (before 1460 – 23 August 1499) was a medieval Bishop of Salisbury.

Blyth was Archdeacon of Richmond from 1485 to 1493  and was Master of the Rolls 5 May 149213 February 1494. He was nominated to Salisbury on 13 November 1493 and consecrated on 23 February 1494, serving until his death five-and-a-half years later, on 23 August 1499. His brother Geoffrey was Bishop of Lichfield.

Notes

References

Date of birth unknown
1499 deaths
Bishops of Salisbury
15th-century English Roman Catholic bishops
Clergy from Sheffield
Masters of the Rolls
Archdeacons of Richmond
15th-century births
Chancellors of the Order of the Garter
Year of birth unknown
Place of birth unknown